This list of the prehistoric life of Montana contains the various prehistoric life-forms whose fossilized remains have been reported from within the US state of Montana.

Precambrian
The Paleobiology Database records no known occurrences of Precambrian fossils in Montana.

Paleozoic

Selected Paleozoic taxa of Montana

 †Achistrum
  †Allenypterus – type locality for genus
 †Allenypterus montanus – type locality for species
 Ammodiscus
 †Amphiscapha
 †Amplexus
 †Aphelaeceras
 †Athyris
 †Atrypa
 †Aulopora
 †Aviculopecten
 †Aviculopecten kaibabensis – or unidentified comparable form
 †Avonia
 †Bathyuriscus
  †Belantsea – type locality for genus
 †Belantsea montana – type locality for species
  †Bellerophon
 †Callograptus
 †Camarotoechia
 †Camarotoechia contracta
 †Camarotoechia crenistria
 †Camarotoechia elegantula
 †Camarotoechia herrickana – or unidentified related form
 †Camarotoechia metallica
 †Camarotoechia mutata
 †Camarotoechia tuta
 †Caninia
  †Caridosuctor – type locality for genus
 †Carinoclymenia
 †Cavusgnathus
 †Cheiloceras
 †Chonetes
 †Chonetes geniculatus
 †Chonetes loganensis
 †Chonetes logani
 †Chonetes ornatus
 †Cladodus
  †Cleiothyridina
 †Cleiothyridina atrypoides
 †Cleiothyridina ciriacksi – type locality for species
 †Cleiothyridina coloradoensis – or unidentified comparable form
 †Cleiothyridina devonica
 †Cleiothyridina hirsuta
 †Cleiothyridina incrassata – or unidentified related form
 †Cleiothyridina sublamellosa
 †Clonograptus
  †Composita
 †Composita humilis
 †Composita laevis
 †Composita lateralis – or unidentified comparable form
 †Composita madisonensis
 †Composita ovata
 †Composita ozarkana
 †Composita sulcata
 †Cornulites
 †Crania
 †Cyranorhis – type locality for genus
  †Cyrtospirifer
 †Cyrtospirifer animaensis
 †Cyrtospirifer animasensis – or unidentified comparable form
 †Cyrtospirifer bertrandi – type locality for species
 †Cyrtospirifer gallatinensis
 †Cyrtospirifer hornellensis
 †Cyrtospirifer monticola
 †Cyrtospirifer perryi – type locality for species
 †Cyrtospirifer thalattodoxa – tentative report
 †Cyrtospirifer whitneyi
 †Cystodictya
 †Damocles – type locality for genus
 †Debeerius – type locality for genus
  †Delphyodontos – type locality for genus
 †Delphyodontos dacriformes – type locality for species
 †Dendrograptus
 †Dictyonema
 †Dikelocephalus
 †Distomodus
 †Echinaria
 †Echinochimaera – type locality for genus
 †Echinochimaera meltoni – type locality for species

 †Echinochimaera snyderi – type locality for species
 †Edmondia
 †Elrathina
 Eocaudina
 †Falcatus
 †Falcatus falcatus
 †Favosites
 †Fenestella
 †Fenestrella
 †Geragnostus
 †Hadronector – type locality for genus
  †Harpagofututor – type locality for genus
 †Harpagofututor volsellorhinus – type locality for species
 †Helicoprion
 †Hyolithes
 †Hypothyris
 †Hypseloconus
 †Irvingella
  †Janassa
 †Joanellia
 †Joanellia lundi
 †Kendallina
 †Kootenia
 †Lingula
 †Lingulella
 †Lioestheria
 †Lithostrotion
 †Lloydia
 †Lochmocercus – type locality for genus
 †Maladia
 †Martinia
 †Maryvillia
 †Megalaspidella
  †Megistaspis
 †Micromitra
 †Naticopsis
 †Naticopsis remex – or unidentified comparable form
 †Neospirifer
 †Neospirifer praenuntius – type locality for species
 †Neospirifer striatus
 †Netsepoye – type locality for genus
 †Nisusia
 † Nix – type locality for genus
 †Obolus
 †Ogyginus
  †Orygmaspis
 †Ozarkodina
 †Ozarkodina deflecta
 †Ozarkodina elongata
 †Ozarkodina macilenta
 †Ozarkodina modesta
 †Ozarkodina regularis
 †Paladin – tentative report
 †Paleolimulus
 †Paratarrasius – type locality for genus
 †Pelagiella
  †Pentremites
 †Peronopsis
 †Pinna
 †Platyceras
 †Platyclymenia
 †Polyosteorhynchus – type locality for genus
 †Prodentalium
  †Proetus
 †Prographularia
 †Ptychagnostus
 †Ptychagnostus atavus
  †Ptychoparia
 † Ramesses – type locality for genus
 †Rota
 †Siksika – type locality for genus
 †Siksika ottae – type locality for species
 †Soris – type locality for genus
 †Spathognathodus
  †Spirifer
 †Spirifer brazerianus – or unidentified related form
 †Spirifer centronatus
 †Spirifer greenockensis – or unidentified comparable form
 †Spirifer grimesi
 †Spirifer louisianensis – or unidentified related form
 †Spirifer marionensis – or unidentified comparable form
 †Spirifer mudulus
 †Spirifer raymondi
 †Spirifer shoshonensis
 †Spirifer welleri – tentative report
 †Spiriferina
 Spirorbis
  †Stethacanthus
 †Stethacanthus altonensis
 †Syringopora
 †Tornoceras
 †Tylonautilus
 †Westergaardodina
 †Wilkingia
 †Worthenia – tentative report

Mesozoic

Selected Mesozoic taxa of Montana

  †Achelousaurus – type locality for genus
 †Achelousaurus horneri – type locality for species
 †Acheroraptor – type locality for genus
 †Acheroraptor temertyorum – type locality for species
  Acipenser
 †Acristavus – type locality for genus
 †Acristavus gagslarsoni – type locality for species
 †Adocus
 †Albanerpeton
 †Albanerpeton nexuosus
 †Albertaceratops
 †Albertaceratops nesmoi
 †Albertosaurus
 †Allocrioceras
  †Allosaurus
  †Alphadon
 †Alphadon attaragos
 †Alphadon halleyi – type locality for species
 †Alphadon marshi
 †Alphadon wilsoni
 †Alzadasaurus – tentative report
 Amia
 †Amphicoelias
 †Anatotitan
 †Anatotitan copei
  †Ankylosaurus – type locality for genus
 †Ankylosaurus magniventris – type locality for species
 †Aquilops – type locality for genus
 †Aquilops americanus – type locality for species
 Aralia – or unidentified comparable form
  †Arcticoceras – tentative report
 †Arctocephalites
 †Arctocephalites gracilis – or unidentified comparable form
 †Arctocephalites maculatus – or unidentified comparable form
 †Arctocephalites platynotus – or unidentified comparable form
 †Arctocephalites sawtoothensis
 †Arctocephalites saypoensis
 †Asplenium
 Astarte
 †Aublysodon
 †Aublysodon mirandus
 †Avaceratops – type locality for genus
 †Avaceratops lammersi – type locality for species
  †Avisaurus – type locality for genus
 †Avisaurus archibaldi – type locality for species
 †Avisaurus gloriae – type locality for species
 Azolla
  †Baculites
 †Baculites asper
 †Baculites codyensis
 †Baculites compressus
 †Baculites mariasensis
 †Baena
 †Bambiraptor – type locality for genus
 †Bambiraptor feinbergi – type locality for species
 Barbourula – or unidentified comparable form
  †Basilemys
 †Belonostomus
 †Belonostomus longirostris
 †Bernissartia
 †Borealosuchus
 †Borealosuchus sternbergii
 Brachaelurus
 †Brachyceratops – type locality for genus
 †Brachyceratops montanensis – type locality for species
  †Brachychampsa – type locality for genus
 †Brachychampsa montana – type locality for species
  †Brachylophosaurus
 †Brachylophosaurus canadensis – type locality for species
 †Camarasaurus
 Campeloma
 Carcharias
 †Cedrobaena
 †Centrosaurus
  †Cerasinops – type locality for genus
 †Cerasinops hodgskissi – type locality for species
 †Ceratodus
 †Ceratops – type locality for genus
 †Ceratops montanus – type locality for species
 †Chamops
  †Champsosaurus
 †Chasmosaurus – or unidentified comparable form
 Chiloscyllium
 †Chirostenotes
 †Chirostenotes elegans
 Chlamys
 †Chondroceras
  †Cimexomys
 †Cimexomys minor
 †Cimolestes
 †Cimolestes incisus
 †Cimolestes stirtoni
 †Cimoliasaurus
 †Cimolodon
 †Cimolodon nitidus
  †Cimolomys
 †Cimolomys clarki – type locality for species
 †Cimolomys gracilis
 †Cimolopteryx
 †Cimolopteryx maxima
  Cladophlebis
 †Cladophlebis alberta
 †Cladophlebis constricta
 †Cladophlebis heterophylla
 †Cladophlebis inclinata
 †Cladophlebis oblongifolia
 †Cladophlebis oerstedi
 †Cladophlebis virginiensis
 †Claosaurus
 †Claraia
 †Claraia aurita
 †Claraia clarai
 †Claraia mulleri
 †Claraia stachei
  †Clidastes
 †Componocancer
 †Componocancer roberti
 †Compsemys
 †Coniophis
 †Continuoolithus
 †Coriops
  †Corythosaurus
 †Corythosaurus casuarius
 †Cretolamna
 †Cretolamna appendiculata
 †Cretorectolobus – type locality for genus
 †Cretorectolobus olsoni – type locality for species
 †Crocodilus
 Cucullaea
  †Daspletosaurus
 †Daspletosaurus horneri – type locality for species
 †Deinodon – type locality for genus
 †Deinodon horridus – type locality for species
  †Deinonychus – type locality for genus
 †Deinonychus antirrhopus – type locality for species
  †Deinosuchus – type locality for genus
 †Deinosuchus rugosus – type locality for species
 Dentalium
 †Derrisemys
 †Diclonius
 †Didelphodon
 †Didymoceras
 †Didymoceras cheyennense
 †Didymoceras nebrascense
 †Didymoceras stevensoni
  †Diplodocus
 †Doratodon – or unidentified comparable form
 †Dromaeosaurus
 †Dromaeosaurus albertensis
 †Dyoplosaurus
 †Dyoplosaurus acutosquameus
 †Edgarosaurus
 †Edgarosaurus muddi
 †Edmontonia
 †Edmontonia longiceps
 †Edmontonia rugosidens – type locality for species
 †Edmontosaurus
  †Edmontosaurus annectens
  †Einiosaurus – type locality for genus
 †Einiosaurus procurvicornis – type locality for species
 †Emarginachelys – type locality for genus
 †Emarginachelys cretacea – type locality for species
 †Eodelphis
 †Eopelobates – or unidentified comparable form
  †Equisetum
 †Essonodon – type locality for genus
 †Essonodon browni – type locality for species
 †Eucrossorhinus
 †Euomphaloceras
  †Euoplocephalus
 †Euoplocephalus tutus
 †Eutrephoceras
 †Exiteloceras
 †Exogyra
 Ficus – or unidentified comparable form
 †Gervillia
 †Gilmoremys
 †Gilmoremys lancensis
  Ginkgo
 †Ginkgoites
 †Glishades – type locality for genus
 †Glishades ericksoni – type locality for species
 †Glyptops
 Glyptostrobus – or unidentified comparable form
  †Gobiconodon – type locality for genus
 †Goniobasis
 †Gorgosaurus
 †Gorgosaurus libratus – type locality for species
  †Gryphaea
 †Gryphaea impressimarginata
 †Gryposaurus
 †Gryposaurus latidens – type locality for species
 †Gryposaurus notabilis
 †Habrosaurus
 †Habrosaurus dilatus
 †Hadrosaurus
 †Hadrosaurus breviceps – type locality for species
 †Hadrosaurus paucidens – type locality for species
 †Hamites
  †Hesperornis
 †Hybodus
 †Hybodus montanensis – type locality for species
  †Hypacrosaurus
 †Hypacrosaurus stebingeri – type locality for species
  †Inoceramus
 †Inoceramus arnoldi
 †Inoceramus canaliculatus
 †Inoceramus cancellatus
 †Inoceramus cardissoides - or unidentified loosely related form
 †Inoceramus cordiformis – or unidentified comparable form
 †Inoceramus erectus
 †Inoceramus fragilis – or unidentified related form
 †Inoceramus frechi – or unidentified comparable form
 †Inoceramus gibbosus
 †Inoceramus gilli – type locality for species
 †Inoceramus glacierensis – type locality for species
 †Inoceramus koeneni
 †Inoceramus latisulcatus – or unidentified comparable form
 †Inoceramus lesginensis
 †Inoceramus lingua – or unidentified comparable form
 †Inoceramus lundbreckensis
 †Inoceramus sokolovi – type locality for species
 †Inoceramus undabundus
 †Inoceramus walterdorfensis
  †Ischyodus
 †Ischyodus bifurcatus
 †Ischyrhiza
 †Ischyrhiza avonicola
 †Ischyrhiza mira
  †Judiceratops – type locality for genus
 †Judiceratops tigris – type locality for species
 †Kritosaurus
 †Krokolithes
  †Lepidotes
 †Lepidotes haydeni – type locality for species
 †Lepidotes occidentalis – type locality for species
  Lepisosteus
 †Leptalestes
 †Leptalestes cooki
 †Leptalestes krejcii
 †Leptalestes prokrejcii
 †Leptalestes toevsi – type locality for species
  †Leptoceratops
 †Leptoceratops gracilis
 †Leptorhynchos – tentative report
 †Lingula
 †Lisserpeton – type locality for genus
 †Lisserpeton atlantes
 †Lisserpeton bairdi – type locality for species
 †Lonchidion
  Lopha
 † Lucina
 Lunatia
 †Magnuviator – type locality for genus
  †Maiasaura – type locality for genus
 †Maiasaura peeblesorum – type locality for species
 †Medusaceratops – type locality for genus
 †Medusaceratops lokii – type locality for species
 †Melvius – type locality for genus
  †Meniscoessus
 †Meniscoessus major
 †Meniscoessus robustus – type locality for species
  †Mercuriceratops – type locality for genus
 †Mercuriceratops gemini – type locality for species
 †Mesodma
 †Mesodma formosa
 †Mesodma hensleighi
 †Mesodma primaeva
 †Mesodma thompsoni
 †Metoicoceras
 †Metoicoceras geslinianum
 †Metoicoceras mosbyense – type locality for species
 †Metoicoceras muelleri
 †Metzgeriites
  †Microvenator – type locality for genus
 †Microvenator celer – type locality for species
 †Modiolus
 †Monoclonius – type locality for genus
 †Monoclonius crassus – type locality for species
 †Monoclonius recurvicornis – type locality for species
 †Monoclonius sphenocerus – type locality for species
 †Montanalestes
  †Montanazhdarcho – type locality for genus
 †Montanazhdarcho minor – type locality for species
  †Montanoceratops
 †Montanoceratops cerorhynchus – type locality for species
 †Montanoolithus – type locality for genus
 †Mosasaurus
 †Mosasaurus missouriensis
 †Myledaphus
 †Myledaphus bipartitus
 †Mytilus
 †Nanotyrannus
 †Nanotyrannus lancensis – type locality for species
 †Naomichelys – type locality for genus
  †Nelumbo
 †Neocardioceras
 †Neocardioceras juddii
 †Neocardioceras minutum
 †Neoplagiaulax
 †Neoplagiaulax burgessi – type locality for species
 †Nezpercius – type locality for genus
 †Nidimys – type locality for genus
  †Normannites – tentative report
 †Notogoneus
 Nucula
 †Obamadon – type locality for genus
 †Obamadon gracilis – type locality for species
 †Odaxosaurus
 †Odaxosaurus piger
  Odontaspis
 †Odontaspis sanguinei – type locality for species
 †Oklatheridium
 †Onchosaurus
  †Oohkotokia – type locality for genus
 †Oohkotokia horneri – type locality for species
 †Ophiomorpha
 †Opisthotriton
  †Ornithomimus
 †Ornithomimus grandis – type locality for species
 †Ornithomimus tenuis – type locality for species
 †Orodromeus – type locality for genus
 †Orodromeus makelai – type locality for species
  †Oryctodromeus – type locality for genus
 †Oryctodromeus cubicularis – type locality for species
 Ostrea
 †Oxytoma
 †Pachycephalosaurus – type locality for genus
 †Pachycephalosaurus wyomingensis – type locality for species
 †Pagiophyllum
  †Palaeobatrachus
 †Palaeosaniwa
 †Palaeosaniwa canadensis
 †Palaeoscincus – type locality for genus
 †Palaeoscincus costatus – type locality for species
 †Palatobaena
 †Paleopsephurus – type locality for genus
 †Paleopsephurus wilsoni – type locality for species
  †Panoplosaurus
 †Pappotherium
 †Paracimexomys
 †Paracimexomys judithae – type locality for species
 †Paracimexomys magnus – type locality for species
 †Paracimexomys priscus
 †Paracimexomys propriscus – type locality for species
 †Paracimexomys robisoni – or unidentified comparable form
 †Paralbula
 †Paramacellodus – or unidentified comparable form
 †Paranecturus – type locality for genus
 †Paranecturus garbanii – type locality for species
  †Parapuzosia
 †Parapuzosia bradyi – type locality for species
  †Paronychodon
 †Paronychodon lacustris
 †Pectinodon – or unidentified comparable form
 Pholadomya
 †Pholadomya kingi
 Physa
 †Piceoerpeton
 †Piksi – type locality for genus
 †Piksi barbarulna – type locality for species
 †Pinna
 †Pistia
 †Plesiobaena
  †Pleuronautilus
 †Prenoceratops – type locality for genus
 †Prenoceratops pieganensis – type locality for species
 †Prismatoolithus
 †Proamphiuma
 †Prodesmodon
  †Prosaurolophus
 †Prosaurolophus blackfeetensis – type locality for species
 †Protocardia
 †Protoscaphirhynchus – type locality for genus
 †Protungulatum
 †Pseudomelania
 †Pteria – tentative report
 †Pteropelyx – type locality for genus
 †Pteropelyx grallipes – type locality for species
 †Ptychotrygon
 †Ptychotrygon blainensis – type locality for species
 †Ptychotrygon triangularis
 Pycnodonte
 Quercus – report made of unidentified related form or using admittedly obsolete nomenclature
  †Quetzalcoatlus – or unidentified comparable form
 †Rhamnus – report made of unidentified related form or using admittedly obsolete nomenclature
 †Richardoestesia
 †Richardoestesia gilmorei
 †Richardoestesia isosceles
 †Rubeosaurus
 †Rubeosaurus ovatus – type locality for species
 †Rugocaudia – type locality for genus
 †Rugocaudia cooneyi – type locality for species
  †Sagenopteris
 †Sagenopteris elliptica
 †Sagenopteris mclearni
 †Sagenopteris williamsii
  †Sauropelta – type locality for genus
 †Sauropelta edwardsorum – type locality for species
 †Saurornitholestes
 †Saurornitholestes langstoni
 †Scapherpeton
 †Scaphites
 †Scaphites impendicostatus
 †Scaphites preventricosus
 †Scaphites ventricosus
 †Scolosaurus
 †Scolosaurus cutleri
 †Scotiophryne – type locality for genus
  †Sequoia
 Sphaerium
 †Sphaerotholus
 †Sphaerotholus buchholtzae – type locality for species
 †Sphenopteris
 †Sphenopteris brulensis
 †Sphenopteris geopperti
 †Sphenopteris latiloba
 †Sphenopteris mclearni
  †Spheroolithus
 †Spheroolithus albertensis
 †Spheroolithus choteauensis – type locality for species
 †Spheroolithus maiasauroides
  †Spiclypeus – type locality for genus
 †Spiclypeus shipporum – type locality for species
 †Spiriferina – report made of unidentified related form or using admittedly obsolete nomenclature
 Squalicorax
 †Squalicorax kaupi
 †Squalicorax pristodontus
 †Squatirhina
 †Squatirhina americana
 †Stegoceras
 †Stegoceras validum
  †Stegosaurus
 †Suuwassea – type locality for genus
 †Suuwassea emilieae – type locality for species
 †Tatankacephalus – type locality for genus
 †Tatankacephalus cooneyorum – type locality for species
  †Tenontosaurus – type locality for genus
 †Tenontosaurus tilletti – type locality for species
  †Terminonaris – type locality for genus
 †Terminonaris robusta – type locality for species
 †Thalassomedon – type locality for genus
 †Thalassomedon hanningtoni – type locality for species
  †Thescelosaurus
 †Thescelosaurus garbanii – type locality for species
 †Thescelosaurus neglectus
 †Toxolophosaurus – type locality for genus
  †Trachodon – type locality for genus
 †Trachodon altidens
 †Trachodon marginatus
 †Trachodon mirabilis – type locality for species
  †Triceratops
 †Triceratops horridus
 †Triceratops maximus – type locality for species
 †Triceratops prorsus
 †Trigonia
 †Trigonia montanaensis
 Trionyx
 †Triprismatoolithus – type locality for genus
  †Troodon – type locality for genus
 †Troodon formosus – type locality for species
 †Tubercuoolithus – type locality for genus
 Turritella
 †Tylosaurus
 †Tylosaurus proriger
  †Tyrannosaurus – type locality for genus
 †Tyrannosaurus rex – type locality for species
 †Ugrosaurus – type locality for genus
 †Ugrosaurus olsoni – type locality for species
 Unio
 †Valenopsalis
 Valvata – tentative report
 Vitis – report made of unidentified related form or using admittedly obsolete nomenclature
 Viviparus
 †Volviceramus
 †Woodwardia – report made of unidentified related form or using admittedly obsolete nomenclature
 †Xenocephalites – tentative report
 Xenophora
 †Yezoites
  †Zamites
 †Zamites arcticus
 †Zapsalis – or unidentified comparable form
 †Zephyrosaurus – type locality for genus
 †Zephyrosaurus schaffi – type locality for species

Cenozoic

Selected Cenozoic taxa of Montana

 Abies
 Abies
 Acer
 †Acheronodon
 †Acheronodon garbani – type locality for species
 Acipenser
  †Acritohippus
 †Acritohippus isonesus
 †Aelurodon
  †Aepycamelus
 †Aepycamelus stocki
 †Agnotocastor
 †Agriochoerus
 †Agrostis
 †Ailanthus
 Alangium
 Alnus
  †Amebelodon
 Amelanchier
 †Amentotaxus
 Amia
 †Ampelopsis
 †Amphechinus
 †Amphicyon
 †Amyzon
 Anas
 †Anas platyrhynchos – or unidentified comparable form
 †Anconodon
 †Anemia
 †Angustidens
 Antilocapra – or unidentified comparable form
 †Antilocapra americana
  †Aphelops
 †Araucaria
 †Archaeocyon
 †Archaeohippus
 †Arctocyon
  †Arctodus
 †Arctodus simus
 †Arctostaphylos
 Arundo
 Arvicola
 †aspera
 †Astronium
 †Athyana
 †Avunculus
  Azolla
 †Baiotomeus
 †Baiotomeus douglassi
 †Baiotomeus lamberti – type locality for species
 †Bathygenys
 †Berberis
 Berchemia
 Betula
 Bibio – or unidentified related form
 Bison
 †Bison bison
  †Bison latifrons – or unidentified comparable form
 †Bisonalveus
 †Bisonalveus browni
 †Blastomeryx
 †Blastomeryx gemmifer
 †Bootherium
 †Borealosuchus
 †Borealosuchus sternbergii
 †Brachychampsa
  †Brachycrus
 †Brachyrhynchocyon
  †Camelops
 †Camelops minidokae
 †Canavalia
 Canis
 †Canis latrans
 †Canis lupus
 †Canna
 †Cardiospermum
 Carpinus
  †Carpolestes
 Carya
 †Cassia
 Castanea
 Castor
 †Castor californicus
 †Castor canadensis
 †Catalpa
 †Catopsalis
 †Catopsalis alexanderi
 †Catopsalis waddleae
  Ceanothus
 Cedrela
 †Celastrus
 Celtis
 Cercidiphyllum
 Cercis
 †Cercocarpus
 †Chamaecyparis
 †Chamops
  †Champsosaurus
  †Chisternon
 †Chriacus
 †Chriacus calenancus
 †Chthonophis – type locality for genus
 †Chthonophis subterraneus – type locality for species
  †Cimexomys
 †Cimexomys minor – type locality for species
 †Cimolestes
 †Cimolestes incisus
  Cinnamomum
 Cissus
 Clematis
 Cocculus
 †Colodon
 †Colubrina
 †Colubrina asiatica – or unidentified comparable form
 †Compsemys
 †Coniophis – or unidentified comparable form
 †Conzattia
 Cornus
 †Corylus
  †Coryphodon
 †Cosoryx – tentative report
 Crataegus
  †Credneria
 Crematogaster
 Culiseta
 †Cynodesmus
 Cynomys
 †Cynomys ludovicianus
 †Dalbergia
 †Dalbergia retusa
 †Daphoenictis – or unidentified comparable form
 †Davidia
 †Derrisemys – type locality for genus
 †Desmatochoerus
 †Diceratherium
 †Didymictis
  †Dinictis
 †Dinohippus
 †Dioctria – tentative report
 †Diospyros
 †Diphysa
 Dipteronia
 †Dissacus
 Dolichoderus
 †Domnina
  †Dromomeryx
 †Dromomeryx borealis
 Dryopteris
 †Ectocion
 †Elomeryx – tentative report
 †Eoconodon
 †Eoconodon nidhoggi
  †Eotitanops
 †Epicyon
 †Epicyon haydeni
 †Epihippus
 †Equisetum
 Equus
 †Equus conversidens – or unidentified comparable form
 †Eucastor
 †Eucommia
  †Eucommia montana
 †Euonymus
 †Euoplocyon
 Exbucklandia
 Ficus
 Fokienia
 Formica
 †Fraxinus
 Geochelone
 Gerrhonotus – or unidentified comparable form
 Ginkgo
  †Ginkgo adiantoides
 Gleichenia
 Glyptostrobus
 †Goniacodon
 †Habrosaurus
 †Habrosaurus dilatus
 †Helaletes
 Helius
  †Helodermoides – type locality for genus
 †Helodermoides tuberculatus – type locality for species
 †Herpetotherium
 †Herpetotherium fugax
 †Herpetotherium knighti – or unidentified comparable form
  †Hesperocyon
 †Heteraletes
 †Hiodon
 Holmskioldia
 †Holopogon
 Homo
 †Homo sapiens
  †Homotherium
 †Homotherium serum
 †Hutchemys – type locality for genus
 †Hyaenodon
 †Hyaenodon crucians
 Hydrangea
 †Hydromystria
 †Hyopsodus
 †Hypertragulus
 †Hypisodus
  †Hypohippus
 †Hypolagus
 †Hypsiops
 †Hyrachyus
 †Hyracodon
 †Ictidopappus
 †Intyrictis
 †Ischyrhiza – or unidentified comparable form
 †Ischyrhiza avonicola
  †Ischyromys
 Isoetes
 Juglans
 †Juglans regia – or unidentified comparable form
  Juniperus
 †Kerria
 †Kimbetohia
 Koelreuteria
 Lasius
 Laurus
 Lemmiscus
 †Lemmiscus curtatus
 Lepisosteus
  †Leptauchenia
 †Leptictis
 †Leptocyon
 †Leptomeryx
 †Leptoreodon
 †Leucaena
 †Limnenetes
 Lindera
 †Lisserpeton
 †Lisserpeton bairdi
  †Lithornis
 †Lithornis celetius – type locality for species
 Lynx
  †Lynx rufus
  Magnolia
 Mahonia
 †Mammut
 †Mammut americanum
 †Mammuthus
 †Mammuthus columbi
  †Mammuthus primigenius
 Marchantia
 Marmota
 Martes
  †Megacerops
 †Megahippus
 †Megalonyx
 †Megalonyx jeffersonii
 †Megantereon
 †Megatylopus
 †Menodus
 †Merriamoceros
 †Merychippus
 †Merychippus sejunctus
 †Merychyus
  †Merycochoerus
 †Merycodus
 †Merycoides
  †Merycoidodon
 †Mesodma
 †Mesodma formosa
 †Mesodma garfieldensis – type locality for species
 †Mesodma pygmaea – type locality for species
 †Mesodma thompsoni
 †Mesohippus
 †Mesoreodon
 Metasequoia
 †Metasequoia occidentalis
 †Metopium
  †Miacis – report made of unidentified related form or using admittedly obsolete nomenclature
 †Microcosmodon
 †Microcosmodon harleyi – type locality for species
 Microtus
 †Microtus pennsylvanicus – or unidentified comparable form
 †Mimetodon
 †Miniochoerus – tentative report
  †Miohippus – type locality for genus
 †Miohippus grandis
 †Monosaulax
 Morus
 Mustela
 †Mustela frenata
 Myrica
 †Nanotragulus
 †Nelumbo
  †Neohipparion
 †Neoplagiaulax
 †Neoplagiaulax donaldorum – type locality for species
 †Neoplagiaulax grangeri – type locality for species
 †Neoplagiaulax hunteri – type locality for species
 †Neoplagiaulax kremnus
 †Neoplagiaulax mckennai
 †Neoplagiaulax nelsoni – type locality for species
 †Niglarodon
 †Nuphar
 †Nyssa
 †Odaxosaurus
 †Odaxosaurus piger
  Odocoileus – or unidentified comparable form
 Olar
 Ondatra
 †Ondatra zibethicus
 †Onoclea
 †Opisthotriton
 Oreohelix
 †Oreonetes
 †Osmanthus
 †Osmunda
 †Osmunda greenlandica
 Ostrya
 †Otarocyon
 †Oxyacodon
  †Oxydactylus
  †Palaeogale
 †Palaeolagus
 †Palaeoryctes
 †Palaeosinopa
  †Palaeosyops
 †Palatobaena
 †Paleopsephurus – or unidentified comparable form
 Paliurus
 †Pandemonium
 †Pantolambda
 †Pantomimus – type locality for genus
  †Paramylodon
 †Paramylodon harlani
 †Paramys
 †Paratomarctus
 †Parectypodus
 †Parectypodus sinclairi – type locality for species
 †Parectypodus sylviae
 †Parictis
 †Parthenocissus
 †Paulownia
  †Peltosaurus
 Penthetria
 †Peraceras
 Perognathus
 Peromyscus
 †Peromyscus maniculatus – or unidentified comparable form
 Persea
  †Phenacodus
 Phragmites
 Picea
 †Piceoerpeton
 Pinus
 †Pithecolobium
 †Planetetherium
 †Planetetherium mirabile – type locality for species
 †Plastomenoides – type locality for genus
 Platanus
 Plecia
  †Plesiadapis
 †Pliohippus
 †Plithocyon
 †Poebrotherium
  †Pogonodon
 Populus
 †Potentilla
 †Prochetodon
 †Prochetodon foxi – type locality for species
 †Prodesmodon
 †Proiridomyrmex
 †Promerycochoerus
 †Proscalops
 †Prosphyracephala
  †Protazteca
 †Protohippus
 †Protolabis
 †Protungulatum
  †Protungulatum donnae
 Prunus
 †Pseudhipparion
 †Pseudolarix
 †Pseudomesoreodon – type locality for genus
 Pseudomyrmex
 †Pseudotsuga
  †Psittacotherium
 Ptelea
 Pteris
 Pterocarya
  †Ptilodus
 †Ptilodus kummae
 †Ptilodus montanus – type locality for species
 †Ptilodus tsosiensis
  †Purgatorius
 †Purgatorius janisae – type locality for species
 †Purgatorius titusi – type locality for species
 †Purgatorius unio – type locality for species
 †Pyracantha
 Quercus
 †Rana – or unidentified comparable form
 Rangifer
 †Rangifer tarandus
 †Rhamnus
 †Rhamnus crocea
 Rhus
 †Robinia
 Rosa
 Sabal
 †Saccoloma
 Salix
 †Sambucus
 †Sapindus
 Sassafras
  †Sassafras hesperia
 †Scapherpeton
 †Scaphohippus
 †Scotiophryne – or unidentified comparable form
 †Selaginella
 Sequoia
 †Sequoia affinis
  †Simoedosaurus
 †Simpson
 †Smilax
 †Sophora
 †Sorbus
 †Sparganium
 Spea
 Spermophilus
 †Spermophilus richardsonii
 †Spiraea
 †Stelocyon
 †Steneofiber
  †Stenomylus
 †Stenomylus hitchcocki – or unidentified comparable form
 Sterculia
 †Stygimys
 †Stygimys camptorhiza – or unidentified comparable form
 †Stygimys jepseni – type locality for species
 †Stygimys kuszmauli – type locality for species
  †Subdromomeryx
 †Subdromomeryx antilopinus
 †Subhyracodon
 †Submerycochoerus
 †Sylvicola fenestralis
 Sylvilagus
 †Sylvilagus nuttallii
 †Symplocarpus
 †Taeniolabis
 †Taeniolabis lamberti – type locality for species
  †Tapocyon
 Taricha
 Taxodium
 †Teleoceras
 †Tetraclaenodon
 Thomomys
 †Thomomys talpoides
 †Thrinax
 †Thuja
 †Ticholeptus
 Tilia
 †Tinuviel
 Tipula
  †Titanoides
 †Titanoides gidleyi
 †Trapa
 †Trigenicus
  †Trigonias
 †Tropidia
 †Tylocephalonyx
 Typha
 Ulmus
 Ursus
  †Vaccinium
 †Valenopsalis
 †Vauquelinia
 †Viburnum
 †Viguiera
 Vitis
 †Viverravus – tentative report
 †Woodwardia
 †Xyronomys
 Zelkova

References
 

Montana